Founder BEA Trust Co., Ltd. is a Chinese trust company, formerly known as Wuhan International Trust and Investment Corporation (WITIC). Founder BEA Trust was a subsidiary of Founder Group for 70.01% stake, with Bank of East Asia owned 19.99%. However, in 2016 Wuhan Financial Holdings Group acquired 57.51% stake from Founder Group. An additional 12.5% stake sold by Founder Group to their associate company China Hi-Tech Group was still pending the approval from China Banking Regulatory Commission, according to the third quarterly report of China Hi-Tech Group in 2016.

Location

 WITIC survived the crash of Guangdong International Trust and Investment Corp. (GITIC) in 1998

References

External links
 

Companies based in Wuhan
Financial services companies of China
Companies owned by the provincial government of China
Bank of East Asia
Peking University
Government-owned companies of China